Ragnarok Online: Valkyrie Uprising was a free MMORPG developed by Gravity and published by NEOCYON for iOS and Android in 2013. The game's servers have since shutdown in 2018. In 2022, a sequel named Ragnarok V: Returns was released.

Plot
After a 100-year war with the Demons, the humans of Midgard forged a fragile truce with the scourge of the Underworld. Valkyrie Randgris threatened the human world using a powerful item stolen from the Underworld, the Cursed Stone. Monica, from the Celestial Land of Valhalla, defeated Randgris and was able to seal her away, never to be seen again. At the time of the game's setting, a mysterious woman broke the seal and disappeared. This releases the dark powers of Randgris and her Cursed Stone, and she is free to terrorize the human world once again.

Classes
There are five classes available, sourced from the original game Ragnarok Online:
 Swordsmen
 Mage
 Acolyte
 Thief
 Archer
Swordsmen are a melee class that focuses on Strength and Vitality as primary stats. The swordsmen class can have two roles, a TANK or a DPS.

 TANK swordsmen - wield shields, and focus on increasing HP, DEF, and MDEF.
 DPS swordsmen - wield two-hand swords (cannot wield shields), and focus on increasing DAMAGE and ATTACK SPEED.

Mages are a casting class that focuses on Intelligence and Agility as primary stats.

Acolytes are a support class that focuses on a mixture of Strength/Agility and Intelligence as their primary stats.

Thieves are a melee class that focuses on Agility as their primary stat and a mixture of Strength and Vitality.

Archers are a ranged class that focuses on Agility and Strength as primary stats.

Servers
Up until May 13, 2015, the game ran on six different servers:
 Poring.
 Mímir.
 Asgard.
 Valhalla.
 Ran.
 Alfeim.
On May 13, 2015, they were merged into three servers: 

 Poring and Ran became Griffon.
 Mimir and Alfheim became Ferus.
 Asgard and Valhalla became Harpy.

References

2013 video games
Android (operating system) games
IOS games
Massively multiplayer online role-playing games

Video games about valkyries
Video games based on Norse mythology
Video games developed in South Korea